The Old Saints Peter and Paul Cemetery, Wrought-Iron Cross Site, near Karlsruhe, North Dakota, United States, is a historic site that was listed on the National Register of Historic Places in  1989.  The listing included 13 contributing objects.

It includes work by Anton Massine of Orrin, who is one of a number of "German-Russian blacksmiths in central North Dakota" who developed individual styles in their crosses and whose "work was known for miles around them."

References

External links
 
 

Cemeteries on the National Register of Historic Places in North Dakota
German-Russian culture in North Dakota
National Register of Historic Places in McHenry County, North Dakota